Seven Pounds is a 2008 American drama film directed by Gabriele Muccino starring Will Smith as a man who sets out to change the lives of seven people. Rosario Dawson, Woody Harrelson, and Barry Pepper also star. The film was released in theaters in the United States and Canada on December 19, 2008, by Columbia Pictures. Despite receiving negative reviews, it was a box-office success, grossing US $168,168,201 worldwide against an estimated budget of $55 million.

Plot
 
In Los Angeles, Ben Thomas berates a sales representative, Ezra Turner, over the phone. Ezra, who is blind, maintains his composure and politely ends the call. At an IRS office after hours, Ben researches Emily Posa, finding that she is being treated for a congenital heart defect. His brother calls, but he denies having taken something from his house.

At an elderly care home, Ben introduces himself as an IRS agent. Administrator Stewart Goodman brags about cutting costs despite buying himself a new BMW. Having paid for an unsuccessful bone marrow transplant, Stewart asks for an extension from the IRS until he can receive a bonus. Ben asks a resident named Inez if Stewart is a "good man", and she reveals that he is punishing her by refusing to bathe her. Ben takes Inez to the washroom himself, angrily denying Stewart’s request for an extension.

Ben tells Emily she is being audited, surprises her at home to assist with her debts, and they begin to bond. He moves into a motel room, where he keeps a deadly box jellyfish.

Ben asks Holly, a child and family services worker, for someone he can help. She directs him to Connie Tepos, a Hispanic immigrant trapped in an abusive relationship. Ben visits Connie and urges her to take action, leaving his business card. He donates a kidney to George, a junior hockey coach who arranged partial scholarships for some of his players to attend college.

When Emily is taken back to the hospital, Ben comforts her with a story about a boy named Tim and his little brother, and spends the night at her bedside. Beaten by her boyfriend, Connie calls Ben, who gives her the deed to his own house, providing her and her children with a safe home.

Emily is placed on the priority list for a heart transplant, and Ben takes her home. He initially rejects her attempts to become closer, but later apologizes, and she shows him her letterpress printing workshop. At the hospital, Ben donates bone marrow to help treat Nicholas, a young patient. Emily invites Ben over; after a romantic evening, he shows her he repaired her antique printing press, and they kiss. Ben’s brother arrives, revealing he is the real IRS agent Ben Thomas; “Ben” is actually Tim, who stole his brother’s identity temporarily. Tim starts to leave, but spends the night with Emily.

After Emily falls asleep, Tim goes to the hospital, where her doctor explains that her rare blood type makes finding a viable donor organ almost impossible. Tim calls his lifelong friend Dan Morris, who has promised to execute Tim's will, and announces, “It’s time”. Returning to his motel room, Tim calls Ezra, to apologize and explain that his previous rude call was to ensure Ezra was a decent person, and Dan will contact him with a “gift”. He then calls 9-1-1 to report his impending suicide.

It is revealed that Tim, once a successful aeronautical engineer, texted while driving and collided with a van, killing all six occupants and his fiancée. Submerged in a bathtub of ice water, Tim allows himself to be stung to death by the jellyfish. His carefully-planned suicide preserves his organs.

Haunted by the deaths of these seven people, Tim was able to save the lives of six others with his organs: Ben required a lobe transplant, Holly receives part of his liver, George a kidney, Nicholas got bone marrow, Emily receives his heart, and Ezra receives his eyes. The seventh, Connie, received Tim's home allowing her and her children to escape an abusive relationship. Emily meets Ezra, who is now a music teacher and has Tim's eyes. Ezra realizes who she is from the heart surgery scar, and they embrace.

Production
Seven Pounds is based on a script written by Grant Nieporte under Columbia Pictures. In June 2007, Will Smith joined the studio to star in the planned film and to serve as one of its producers. In September 2007, director Gabriele Muccino, who worked with Smith on The Pursuit of Happyness (2006), was attached to direct Seven Pounds, bringing along his creative team from the 2006 film. Smith was joined by Rosario Dawson and Woody Harrelson the following December to star in Seven Pounds. Filming began in February 2008.

Most of the film was shot in Los Angeles, Pasadena, and Malibu, California. Points of interest used in the film include the Travel Inn in Tujunga, California, the Colorado Bar, the Huntington Library, the Sheraton, and the Pasadena Ice Skating Rink all in Pasadena, as well as Malibu Beach in Malibu.

Cast 
 Will Smith as Ben Thomas (actually Tim Thomas, using his brother's name)
Smith described the reason he took on the role:

Smith felt that the character needed to be a quiet and rather introverted person who does not burn himself out at every possible instance. The character was a contrast to Smith's previous characters, and Smith felt that director Gabriele Muccino's trust in him helped him relax and avoid overextending himself. Smith acknowledged Seven Pounds as a drama film, but he saw it as more of a love story.
 Michael Ealy as Ben Thomas, Tim's brother
Will Smith handpicked Ealy for the role of the main character's brother. Connor Cruise, the adopted son of actor Tom Cruise and actress Nicole Kidman, was cast in his first role as a younger version of Ben Thomas.

Title 
Before the film's release, the title Seven Pounds was considered a "mystery" which the studio refused to explain. Early trailers for Seven Pounds kept the film's details a mystery. Director Gabriele Muccino explained the intent: "The [audience] will not know exactly what this man is up to." In an interview Will Smith said that the title is a reference to Shakespeare's The Merchant of Venice, in which a debtor must pay a pound of flesh. In this case, it amounts to seven gifts to seven individuals deemed worthy by Smith's character, to atone for seven deaths he caused.

Release

Box office 
Seven Pounds was promoted on a five-city tour across the United States in November 2008, screening in Cleveland, Miami, Dallas, St. Louis, and Denver to raise funds for food banks in each region. The film was promoted at a charity screening in Minneapolis in support of Second Harvest Heartland. Since screenings of new films usually took place in Los Angeles or New York City, the choice of cities was unconventional. Smith said, "This is more like the old-school music tours. Different clubs, different cities, meeting people. You get in touch with what people are feeling and thinking, and it's much more personal when you're actually out shaking hands." The actor sought to "get reacquainted" with an America that he felt had an "openness to change" with the country's election of Barack Obama as the first African-American president.

The film was released on December 19, 2008, to 2,758 theaters in the United States and Canada. It grossed an estimated US$16 million, placing second at the weekend box office after Yes Man. The opening gross was the lowest for a film starring Smith since Ali in 2001. The gross was US$5 million less than anticipated, partially ascribed to winter storms in the Northeast over the weekend.

Critical reception 
The film received generally negative reviews from critics. Rotten Tomatoes gave the film a rating of 27% based upon a sample of 195 reviews with an average rating of 4.7/10. The website's critics consensus reads, "Grim and morose, Seven Pounds is also undone by an illogical plot." On Metacritic, the film has a weighted average score of 36 out of 100 based on reviews from 33 critics, indicating "generally unfavorable reviews".

Varietys film reviewer Todd McCarthy predicted that the movie's climax "will be emotionally devastating for many viewers, perhaps particularly those with serious religious beliefs," and characterized the film as an "endlessly sentimental fable about sacrifice and redemption that aims only at the heart at the expense of the head." A. O. Scott, writing for The New York Times, said that the movie "may be among the most transcendently, eye-poppingly, call-your-friend-ranting-in-the-middle-of-the-night-just-to-go-over-it-one-more-time crazily awful motion pictures ever made."

Positive reviews singled out Dawson's performance. Richard Corliss wrote in Time that Dawson gives "a lovely performance," while Mick LaSalle of the San Francisco Chronicle noted that Dawson's performance "shows once again that she has it in her to be the powerhouse." Roger Ebert of the Chicago Sun Times commented on the fact that the audience is kept completely out of the loop as to what Ben is doing, comparing the film to Jean-Pierre Melville's Le Samouraï, pointing out how he "finds this more interesting than a movie about a man whose nature and objectives are made clear in the first five minutes, in a plot that simply points him straight ahead."

Home media 
The film was released on DVD on March 31, 2009, by Sony Pictures Home Entertainment. The film is also available to rent or buy on the PlayStation Network in standard or high-definition format. , in North American DVD sales, the film has grossed US $28,812,423.

References

External links
 
 
 
 
 

2008 films
2008 drama films
American drama films
Columbia Pictures films
Films about suicide
Films shot in Los Angeles
Relativity Media films
Films produced by Will Smith
Escape Artists films
Films directed by Gabriele Muccino
Films set in Los Angeles
Films shot in Los Angeles County, California
Films about organ transplantation
Overbrook Entertainment films
2000s English-language films
2000s American films
English-language drama films